Reading High School may refer to:

 North Reading High School, North Reading, Massachusetts, United States
 Reading Senior High School, Reading, Pennsylvania, United States
 Reading High School (Ohio), Reading, Ohio, United States
 Reading Memorial High School, Reading, Massachusetts, United States
 The original name of The Abbey School, Reading, Berkshire, England